Mark Thomas (born 1963), is a male former weightlifter who competed for Great Britain and England.

Weightlifting career
Thomas represented Great Britain in the 1988 Summer Olympics.

He represented England and won three gold medals in the 110 kg sub-heavyweight division, at the 1990 Commonwealth Games in Auckland, New Zealand. The three medals were won during an unusual period when three medals were awarded in one category (clean and jerk, snatch and combined) which invariably led to the same athlete winning all three of the same colour medal.

References

1963 births
English male weightlifters
Commonwealth Games medallists in weightlifting
Commonwealth Games gold medallists for England
Weightlifters at the 1990 Commonwealth Games
Weightlifters at the 1988 Summer Olympics
Olympic weightlifters of Great Britain
Living people
Medallists at the 1990 Commonwealth Games